, is a 2015 Fuji TV Japanese television drama series starring Satomi Ishihara and Tomohisa Yamashita.  The drama is based on the manga series From Five to Nine by Miki Aihara. It aired from 12 October 2015 to 14 December 2015 with a total of 10 episodes. The first episode received a viewership rating of 12.6% in the Kantō region.

Plot  
Junko Sakuraba (Satomi Ishihara) is a 29-year-old English teacher who dreams of working in New York. One day, she causes an embarrassing accident resulting in her encountering a handsome Buddhist priest during a funeral service at a temple. Hoping to never meet him again, she is later deceived by her family and forced to go to a matchmaking session. The other party is none other than that priest, Takane Hoshikawa (Tomohisa Yamashita).

Cast
 Satomi Ishihara as Junko Sakuraba
 Tomohisa Yamashita as Takane Hoshikawa
 Yuki Furukawa as Satoshi Mishima
 Saeko as Masako Mōri
 Rin Takanashi as Momoe Yamabuchi
 Mokomichi Hayami as Arthur Kimura (Arthur Lange in manga)
 Miyu Yoshimoto as Kaori Ashikaga
 Jun Shison as  Amane Hoshikawa
 Mariko Kaga as Hibari Hoshikawa
 Kokoro Terada as Sankyu Naha

Episodes

References

External links
  
 
 

Japanese drama television series
2015 Japanese television series debuts
2015 Japanese television series endings
Fuji TV dramas
Buddhist comics
Television series about Buddhism